The King's Counsel Selection Panel is an independent and self-funding body responsible for awarding appointments as a King's Counsel within England and Wales.

Background

In 2003, appointments to Queen's Counsel (QC) were suspended and expected to stop altogether as part of major reforms to the UK legal system. Whilst response to other elements of the proposed reform was generally positive, many from within the legal profession were critical of the proposal. Critics argued that the QC system was effective in combatting discrimination and that it provided a way for clients to differentiate between lawyers.

In 2004, the government opted to retain the title of QC, although it was accepted that major reforms were needed in order to increase the openness of the system and disassociate the appointment of QCs from the branches of government.

In 2005, the Queen's Counsel Selection Panel was set up to manage the appointment of Silks in the new system.

Structure
The panel consists of at least nine (currently nine) members. At all times the panel must contain at least one senior barrister, senior solicitor, retired senior judge and lay members without legal qualifications. The chair of the panel is always a lay member.

All appointments to silk are the de facto responsibility of the panel, which passes a list of appointees to the Lord Chancellor who then officially advises the Monarch. The Lord Chancellor, who is a member of the Government, does not have any veto or influence over the system and must act on the advice of the panel.

Once the monarch formally approves the candidates, letters patent are drawn up and appointees are entitled to refer to themselves with the postnominal "KC" and enjoy the professional advantages of the post.

In December 2021, the members of the panel were:
 Sir Alex Allan (chair)
 Christina Blacklaws (lay member)
 Dr. Douglas Board (lay member)
 Rachel Langdale KC
 Sara Nathan OBE
 Dame Anne Rafferty PC
 Rosemary Rollason (lay member)
 Dr. Maggie Semple OBE
 Monisha Shah (lay member)
 His Honour Phillip Sycamore CBE
 Andrew Walker KC

Competitions
The panel runs an annual "competition" to appoint new King's Counsels. Applications are accepted from senior members of the legal profession who have higher rights of audience, no particular level of experience is required, but the highly competitive nature of the process ensures that applicants with few years' experience are not likely to succeed.

Applicants are expected to submit evidence of exceptional capability as advocates in the Higher Courts. They are required to name references (judges, colleagues and clients) who will attest to their competencies and attend an interview with two panel members. Applicants are judged based on the evidence submitted including their references, interview performance, ability and results attained in complex and important cases and key competencies.

As the panel is self-funding, applicants are required to pay the cost of their applications. Currently, the non-refundable fee for all applicants is £2,340 and successful candidates are required to pay a further fee of £4,415 in addition to the costs of letters patent.

See also
Bar Council
Law Society
Judicial Appointments Commission

References

External links
 The Bar Council
 The Law Society

King's Counsel
Legal organisations based in England and Wales